Anglesea Barracks is an Australian Defence Force barracks in central Hobart, Tasmania.
The site was chosen in December 1811 by Lachlan Macquarie and construction began on the first buildings to occupy the site in 1814. It is the oldest Australian Army barracks still in use and celebrated its bicentenary in December 2011.

Despite the small variation in spelling it was named after Henry Paget, 1st Marquess of Anglesey who was involved with the Board of Ordnance.

Current units and facilities

Anglesea Barracks is the administrative centre for all Defence sites in Tasmania.

The barracks is home to various civilian and military departments including:
Battalion HQ, 12th/ 40th Battalion, The Royal Tasmania Regiment;
Adelaide Universities Regiment, Tasmania Company;
Australian Army Band – Tasmania;
No. 29 Squadron RAAF (Royal Australian Air Force);
Navy Headquarters Tasmania (Royal Australian Navy);
TS Hobart, Australian Navy Cadet Band
Anglesea Barracks Medical Centre;
Defence Estate and Infrastructure Group – Service Delivery Division Victoria & Tasmania;
Defence Force Recruiting
Australian Air Force Cadets - 502 Squadron & 5 Wing Headquarters
Australian Army Cadets - Tasmania Battalion Headquarters

Angelsea Barracks messing

The barracks contains an Officers' Mess and Sergeants' Mess.

Other facilities
It also houses, in the old gaol, the Army Museum of Tasmania.

The  site is also home to one of two Defence National Contact Centres with the other being located in Cooma, NSW.

Notes

References

External links

 Discover Tasmania: Anglesea Barracks
 Military Museum of Tasmania

Barracks in Australia
Buildings and structures in Hobart
1814 establishments in Australia
Residential buildings completed in 1814
Commonwealth Heritage List places in Tasmania
Military installations in Tasmania